The 2002 Telefónica World Series by Nissan was contested over 9 race weekends/18 rounds. In this one-make formula all drivers had to use Dallara chassis (Dallara SN01) and Nissan engines (Nissan VQ). 10 different teams and 30 different drivers competed.

Teams and Drivers

Calendar

Every second race saw a mandatory pit stop.

Race 17 originally scheduled over 17 laps, but abandoned due to rain.

Final points standings

Driver

For every race the points were awarded: 20 points to the winner, 15 for runner-up, 12 for third place, 10 for fourth place, 8 for fifth place, 6 for sixth place, 4 for seventh place, winding down to 1 point for 10th place. Lower placed drivers did not award points. Additional points were awarded to the driver setting the fastest race lap (2 points). The best 14 race results count, but all additional points count.

 Points System:

Teams

External links

Renault Sport Series seasons
World Series by Nissan
World Series by Nissan
World Series by Nissan